Atlantic University Sport (AUS) is a regional membership association for universities in Atlantic Canada which assists in co-ordinating competition between their university level athletic programs and providing contact information, schedules, results, and releases about those programs and events to the public and the media.  This is similar to what would be called a college athletic conference in the United States. The AUS, which covers Canada east of the province of Quebec, is one of four such bodies that are members of the country's governing body for university athletics, U Sports. The other three regional associations coordinating university-level sports in Canada are Ontario University Athletics (OUA), the Canada West Universities Athletic Association (CW), and the Réseau du sport étudiant du Québec (RSEQ).

History

The Atlantic Universities Athletics Association was founded in 1974, with the merging of the Atlantic Intercollegiate Athletic Association and the Atlantic Women's Intercollegiate Athletic Association.  Prior to the acceptance of Memorial University of Newfoundland, the AIAA, which dates back to the late 19th century, was known as the Maritime Intercollegiate Athletic Association. The AUAA changed its name to Atlantic University Sport (AUS) in 1999.

Member schools

Full members

Single-sport members 
The AUS accepted its first ever single-sport member at the start of the 2017–18 school year, when the Bishop's Gaiters football team transferred from the Réseau du sport étudiant du Québec (RSEQ).

Facilities

<div style=>

(Data mined from the U Sports homepage's member directory and WorldStadiums.com.

References

External links
 

U Sports
College athletics conferences in Canada
U Sports basketball
U Sports football
U Sports volleyball
Sport in Atlantic Canada
Sports universities and colleges
1974 establishments in Canada